Diego Miguel López Santos (born 14 March 1974) is a Spanish former professional footballer who played as a midfielder.

Career
López started his career in 1991 with CD Málaga. He made his professional bow during a Segunda División win away to Sabadell on 17 November, with eight further appearances following as they were relegated. 1993 saw López move to Málaga CF of Segunda División B. He netted six goals, including two on his debut in the Copa del Rey over Almería, in the 1993–94 campaign as he again suffered relegation. Almería subsequently signed López at the end of that season. Eleven goals in thirty-six fixtures came with promotion to the second tier in his first campaign. After two seasons, López was relegated for a third time as they placed seventeenth.

Despite going down with Almería, López moved up to La Liga in 1996 after agreeing a deal with Hércules. Goals against Espanyol and Athletic Bilbao arrived but it was to be relegation again for the midfielder as Hércules finished twenty-first. A short stint with Granada followed, prior to López featuring for Xerez and Ceuta between 1998 and 2001. In 2001, López joined Segunda División B side Motril. His first season with the club ended with the Group IV title, though they missed out on promotion to Getafe, but his secondary campaign concluded with a fifth career relegation. López had subsequent spells with Novelda, Linense and Granada 74.

Career statistics

Honours
Motril
Segunda División B: 2001–02 Group IV

References

External links

1974 births
Living people
Footballers from Málaga
Spanish footballers
Association football midfielders
Segunda División players
Segunda División B players
La Liga players
CD Málaga footballers
Málaga CF players
UD Almería players
Hércules CF players
Granada CF footballers
Xerez CD footballers
AD Ceuta footballers
Motril CF players
Novelda CF players
Real Balompédica Linense footballers
Granada 74 CF footballers